Prosimuliini is a tribe of black flies. It contains over 140
living species, with more than a half of them in the genus Prosimulium. There are 6 living genera, and 2 genera that are only known from Cretaceous fossils.

Living genera

Gymnopais Stone, 1949
Helodon Enderlein, 1921
Subgenus Distosimulium Peterson, 1970
Subgenus Helodon Enderlein, 1921
Subgenus Parahelodon Peterson, 1970
Levitinia Chubareva & Petrova, 1981
Prosimulium Roubaud, 1906
Twinnia Stone & Jamnback, 1955
Urosimulium Contini, 1963

Fossil genera
Kovalevimyia Kalugina, 1991
Simulimima Kalugina, 1985

References

Simuliidae
Nematocera tribes